The Barkley Mountains are a small group of mountains including Kvitkjolen Ridge and Isingen Mountain, rising between Kvitsvodene Valley and Rogstad Glacier in the Sverdrup Mountains of Queen Maud Land. They were discovered by the Third German Antarctic Expedition under Alfred Ritscher, 1938–39, and named for Erich Barkley, biologist on the expedition. They were surveyed by the Norwegian-British-Swedish Antarctic Expedition, 1949–52.

References
 

Mountain ranges of Queen Maud Land
Princess Martha Coast